Kathleen Mavis McNamee (January 8, 1931 – January 11, 2022), known as Kay McNamee, was a Canadian swimmer. She competed at the 1948 Summer Olympics and the 1952 Summer Olympics.

Personal life
McNamee was born on January 8, 1931, in Vancouver, British Columbia, Canada, and died in Richmond, British Columbia, on January 11, 2022, three days after her 91st birthday, from complications of COVID-19. Her son, with Canadian "Miracle Mile" runner Richard Ferguson, is Australian-born Canadian actor John Pyper-Ferguson.

References

External links

1931 births
2022 deaths
Canadian female swimmers
Olympic swimmers of Canada
Swimmers at the 1948 Summer Olympics
Swimmers at the 1952 Summer Olympics
Swimmers from Vancouver
20th-century Canadian women
21st-century Canadian women
Deaths from the COVID-19 pandemic in Canada